Sheu Yu-jer (27 October 1952 – 15 February 2020) was a Taiwanese politician. He was the Minister of Finance since 20 May 2016 until 16 July 2018.

Education
Sheu received his bachelor's degree in finance and taxation from National Chengchi University, where he was a classmate of Lin Chuan, and his master's degree in law from Harvard University in the United States.

Career
Sheu served within the Ministry of Finance as director-general of the Taxation Agency. By 2013, he was deputy finance minister under Chang Sheng-ford. Sheu was appointed finance minister by Premier Lin Chuan on 15 April 2016. He was replaced by Su Jain-rong in July 2018. Sheu then led the Taiwan Futures Exchange. He died on 15 February 2020, aged 67.

References

1952 births
Harvard Law School alumni
2020 deaths
Taiwanese Ministers of Finance
National Chengchi University alumni
Taiwanese expatriates in the United States